The James Hornsby School is a co-educational secondary school located in Laindon, in the Borough of Basildon, Essex, England. It was formed from the merger in 1998 of the Laindon School and Nicholas Comprehensive, and occupies the site of the latter.

The name 'James Hornsby' comes from the name of the last headmaster who taught at the nearby St Nicholas's Church in the 19th century.

The school specialised and became James Hornsby High School Sports College by 2009 and became an academy in October 2012, changing the name to James Hornsby School. The school is also working with The King John School in South Benfleet.

History 
In 1928 the Laindon High Road County Senior School opened and in 1963 the Nicholas School opened. It became St. Nicholas Comprehensive in September 1968 and the school in Laindon became The Laindon School in the 1980s. "St." was dropped from Nicholas' name in the 1970s due to religious reasons.

In 1990 Nicholas became the first secondary in Basildon to be honoured with the Schools Curriculum Award and in 1993 the first to be inspected by Ofsted. Due to a stagnating student population in both schools the Essex County Council decided to amalgamate both schools and they closed in July 1998. After closure Laindon's campus hosted the new James Hornsby High School while the Nicholas campus was renovated. The James Hornsby school reopened on the Nicholas campus in September 2000 and the Laindon campus closed for the last time.

Buildings
The school has two main buildings. The main three-storey building accommodates the English and media, science, mathematics and IT departments. The science laboratories had major refurbishment in 2010. The building also has a series of one-storey blocks which house the language, visual arts, PE, health and social care, music and dance departments. The reception, cafeteria, library and staff offices are also located in the main building.

The second building is the "Humanities Block". This also has a main three-storey block which accommodates the history, geography, RE, classical civilisations. The building also has another block within containing two IT rooms, drama, resistant materials, food technology, graphic design and public services departments. The "servery" is also located in this block as an alternative food vendor to the cafeteria.

A third building has been added to the campus, opened in October 2010.

The school has a sports hall, gymnasium, two performing arts studios, large assembly hall and a swimming pool. In July 2010, the sports hall underwent work to make a new corridor and extension which was completed in December 2010. The new extension has been designed to meet Disability Discrimination Act 2005 guidelines. The extension has two floors, the top floor acting as a further class room and observation room into the sports hall. On the lower floor there is a disabled toilet and another observation room for the swimming pool that can be hired out.

Uniform
The uniform at James Hornsby was changed in September 2012 from blazers and yellow and blue ties to black blazers with the school's new logo and new school ties with one of four different colours (for each of the colleges) with black trousers and a white shirt.

Subjects
All pupils study English, mathematics, science, PE and PSHRE (Personal, Social, Religious and Health Education).

Pupils in years 7 and 8 also study modern languages, art, music, drama, food technology, graphic design, history and geography. These are offered as options in years 9, 10 and 11, along with public services, health and social care, photography and travel and tourism.

Years 9, 10 and 11 also do ASDAN (Award Scheme Development and Accreditation Network).

Headteachers and deputy headteachers

Laindon School

Heads 

 Mr. George Radford (1928-1949)
 Mr. Jack H.J. Woodward (1949-1962)
 Mr. W. Day (1963-1966)
 Mrs D. Clark (1966)
 Mr. Arthur H.J. Chadband (1967-1988)
 Mr. Newton (1988-1990s)
 Mr. Brian Gillman (1990s-1996)
 Mr. Michael Feehan (1997-1998)

Deputies 

 Ms. Janet Duke (1933-1964, also Headmistress at Markham's Chase Primary renamed Janet Duke Primary in her memory)

Nicholas School

Heads 

 Mr. John Goodier (1963-1970s)
 Mr. John Greener (1970s-1982)
 Mr. John Cooper (1982-1998)

Deputies 

 Mrs. Coulthard (1963-1975)
 Mrs. Betty Barrett (1975-1979)
 Mrs. Giordan (1979-1983)
 Mr. Robin Lees (1983-1985)
 Mr. Ken Edwards (1985-1988)
 Ms. Christine Jeffries (1988-1998)

James Hornsby School

Heads 
 Mrs. balls White (1998-2005)
 Ms. Gill Hillman/Mrs. Gill Thomas (2005-2010)
Mr. Nick Feltimo (2010)
Mr. Chris Hayes (2011-2012)
Mr. Stuart Reynolds (2012-2013)
Mrs. Margaret Wilson (Executive 2012-2018)
 Mr. Jason Carey (2013-2019)
Mr. Daniel Steel (2019-2021)
 Mrs. Tammy Nicholls (2021–present)

Deputies 

 Mr. Freeman (2015-2018)
Mr. Samuel Hurst, Mrs. Pip Frend and Mr. David Back (2021–present)

Notable former pupils

Nicholas School
Martin Gore and Andy Fletcher of electronic band Depeche Mode attended St. Nicholas Comprehensive and the band played their first gig there. Gore and Fletcher shared a class with Cure member Perry Bamonte and singer Alison Moyet. Nicholas was also attended by Bob The Builder and PAW Patrol creator, Keith Chapman, Screenwriter, Playwright and Director Vincent O'Connell  and Conservative Member of Parliament for Rayleigh and Wickford, Mark Francois.

Laindon School 
Depeche Mode member Vince Clarke went to Laindon School and later formed Yazoo with Nicholas Comprehensive's Alison Moyet.

References

External links
 James Hornsby's website
 Essex BSF Schools

Secondary schools in Essex
Borough of Basildon
Academies in Essex
Educational institutions established in 1998
1998 establishments in England